Enthroned is a Belgian black metal band formed in Charleroi. It is one of the premier acts of the Belgian black metal scene.

History 
The band was founded in 1993 by drummer Cernunnos. He soon recruited guitarist Tsebaoth and a vocalist from grindcore/black metal band Hecate who stayed until the end of December 1993. Then bassist/vocalist Sabathan joined. The band released a five-track demo tape in mid-1994 which brought them to the attention of several independent labels. A 7-inch split EP with Ancient Rites was then released by the underground label Afterdark Records. After the label's demise, Evil Alliance Records (a sub-label of Osmose Productions) released Enthroned's first full-length release, Prophecies of Pagan Fire. Shortly thereafter, the band enlisted second guitarist Nornagest. Eventually, Tseboath was replaced by Nebiros.

In 1996, along with Ancient Rites and Bewitched, Enthroned began an extensive tour of Europe.

In April 1997, as Enthroned was to begin recording Towards the Skullthrone of Satan, Cernunnos committed suicide by hanging himself. He was 25 years old. Enthroned recorded the album with a session drummer in honor of Cernunnos and performed at the Dragons Blaze festival with newly acquired drummer Namroth Blackthorn.

In April 1998, the band toured the European continent with Dark Funeral and also released the mini CD Regie Sathanas: A Tribute to Cernunnos, which was dedicated to their former drummer Cernunnos. Later that year, they toured again with labelmates Hecate Enthroned and Usurper. At the close of 1998, the band entered Abyss Studios (Sweden) to record The Apocalypse Manifesto. The band's third album was released in May 1999 and dealt with the biblical concept of the Apocalypse as interpreted by a Norse mythological perspective.

Enthroned rounded off the 20th Century on tour with Marduk and continued to tour in Europe.

In 2000, the band parted ways with Nebiros and recruited Nerath Daemon as their new guitarist, went on a German mini tour followed by several other European shows and recorded Armoured Bestial Hell at Real Sound Studio (Germany). This fourth album was released in April 2001. Namroth Blackthorn was replaced by Alsvid from the French black metal band Seth. Enthroned continued to play many live gigs in and around Europe, as well as in the US.

In early 2002, Enthroned signed to Napalm Records releasing their fifth full-length recording, Carnage in Worlds Beyond, later that year. In June 2003, Nguaroth (guitars) and Glaurung (drums) joined Enthroned, which played a South American tour and released their sixth album, XES Haereticum.

In 2005, Enthroned released their first official live album, Black Goat Ritual, recorded during their tour of Brazil. Enthroned parted ways with longtime vocalist Sabathan, at which time Nornagest took over the vocals and Phorgath joined the band on bass.

In June 2007, Enthroned recorded their seventh album Tetra Karcist, seeing the return of old drummer Alsvid for the studio sessions.

Ahephahim joined as the new official drummer in June 2007 and Enthroned signed with Regain Records in January 2008. At this time, some members of the band opened a recording studio, Blackout Multimedia. In the meantime, Ahephaim and Nguaroth left the band due to lack of time and were replaced by ex-Gorgoroth drummer Garghuf. Nerath Daemon took back the position he left five years ago in Enthroned, changing his name to Neraath. Enthroned's eight album, Pentagrammaton, was released on 22 March 2010. Since then, Nornagest has given up playing guitar in live performances, due to chronic tendonitis in his wrist, and has instead become the band's frontman. Former members Lord Sabathan and Nguaroth joined the band for a one-off live performance in 2010 as an act of reconciliation.

In September 2011, Enthroned announced that their collaboration with Regain Records had ended while the band was busy recording their ninth studio album which was titled Obsidium and was released on 10 March 2012 through Agonia Records.

On 15 April 2014 Enthroned released their tenth studio album; Sovereigns.

In 2016, long time bassist Phorgath and guitarist ZarZax departed the band on amicable terms, and were replaced by Norgaath and Shagãl respectively for live shows and officially joined the band in 2018.

In 2017, Enthroned ended their contract with Agonia Records. According to Nornagest the band's eleventh studio album has been on the works since 2017. In December 2018 the band announced on their Facebook page alongside their 25th anniversary post that their next album will be released on 2019.
In January 2019 Enthroned announced that they have signed with Season of Mist to release their new album as well as future projects. They will also embark on a world tour to support the album.  On March 20, 2019, Cold Black Suns was revealed as the title of their eleventh album which was released on June 7. On April 15 the band released a music video for the song "Hosanna Satana".
On October 1, 2019 the band announced that guitarist ZarZax had rejoined the band since Shagãl decided to leave Enthroned in order to focus on his band, Vibrion.

Line-up 
 Nornagest – guitars (1995–present), lead vocals (2007–present)
 Neraath – guitars (2000–2004, 2009–present)
 Menthor – drums (2012–present)
 ZarZax – guitar (2012–2018, 2019–present)
 Norgaath – bass (2018–present)

Former members
 Shagãl – guitars (2018–2019)
 Phorgath – bass (2006–2017)
 Garghuf – drums (2009–2012)
 Ahephaim – drums (2007–2009)
 Nguaroth – guitars (2004–2009)
 Alsvid – drums (2001–2004, 2007)
 Lord Sabathan – lead vocals, bass (1993–2006)
 Glaurung – drums (2004–2007)
 Namroth Blackthorn – drums (1997–2001)
 Nebiros – guitar (1995–2000)
 Cernunnos – drums (1993–1997; died 1997)
 Tsebaoth – guitar (1993–1995)

Timeline

Discography 
 Prophecies of Pagan Fire (Full-length, 1995, Evil Omen Productions) - Re-released with a bonus CD entitled Commanders of Chaos in 1999 by Blackend Records
 Towards the Skullthrone of Satan (Full-length, 1997, Blackend Records)
 Regie Sathanas: A Tribute to Cernunnos (EP, 1998, Blackend Records)
 The Apocalypse Manifesto (Full-length, 1999, Blackend Records)
 Armoured Bestial Hell (Full-length, 2001, Blackend Records)
 Carnage in Worlds Beyond (Full-length, 2002, Napalm Records)
 Goatlust (EP, 2003, Painkiller Records)
 XES Haereticum (Full-length, 2004, Napalm Records)
 Black Goat Ritual: Live in Thy Flesh (Live album, 2005, Napalm Records)
 Tetra Karcist (Full-length, 2007, Napalm Records)
 Pentagrammaton (Full-length, 2010, Regain Records)
 Obsidium (Full-length, 2012, Agonia Records)
 Sovereigns (Full-length, 2014, Agonia Records)
 Cold Black Suns (Full-length, 2019, Season of Mist)

References

External links 

 AllMusic listing

1993 establishments in Belgium
Belgian black metal musical groups
Belgian heavy metal musical groups
Musical groups established in 1993
Musical quintets